Barry Lee Strayer, OC (born August 13, 1932 in Moose Jaw, Saskatchewan) served as a Justice of the Canadian Federal Court of Appeal and later as a Deputy Judge of the Federal Court of Canada. He is known as one of the instrumental drafters of the Canadian Charter of Rights and Freedoms.

In 1959, Strayer graduated from the faculty of law at the University of Saskatchewan. He worked at the Department of Justice in Saskatchewan until 1963 at which point he began teaching at the University of Saskatchewan. He eventually became the Director of the Constitutional Law Division of the Privy Council Office. In 1974, he was appointed Assistant Deputy Minister of Justice where he spent several years working on first drafts of the Charter.

In 2008, he was made an Officer of the Order of Canada.

References

External links 
Barry L. Strayer at the Federal Court of Canada
Entry from Canadian Who's Who

Judges of the Federal Court of Appeal (Canada)
Officers of the Order of Canada
1932 births
Living people
Judges of the Court Martial Appeal Court of Canada